Eutingen (Baden) station is a railway station in the municipality of Eutingen an der Enz, located in the Enzkreis district in Baden-Württemberg, Germany.

References

Railway stations in Baden-Württemberg
Buildings and structures in Enzkreis